Harlem Academy is an independent, nonprofit, co-educational school (grades K-8) accredited by the New York State Association of Independent Schools (NYSAIS). It was founded in 2004.

Academics and curriculum

Primary 

The primary school includes kindergarten through second grade.

Literacy 
Primary school students spend more than two hours each day focused on literacy, providing students with a literature-rich environment that offers many opportunities to learn and practice reading skills and strategies.

Math 
Harlem Academy uses the Math in Focus Singapore math program, which focuses on teaching fewer concepts with greater depth and more complex problem solving than typical programs in the United States.

Science 
Harlem Academy uses the inquiry-based FOSS curriculum to guide lessons. Primary school units focus on life, physical, and earth sciences

Elementary 
The elementary school includes grades three through five.

Literacy 
Elementary school students spend more than two hours each day focused on reading, writing, listening, and speaking. This program serves as a bridge from the primary school approach to the novel-driven study in middle school. Whole-class readings and the library collection have been carefully selected to include authors and protagonists of color.

Math 
Harlem Academy uses the Math in Focus Singapore math program, which focuses on teaching fewer concepts with greater depth and more complex problem solving than typical programs in the United States.

Science 
Students are encouraged to engage in the process of scientific investigation and inquiry, preparing them to succeed in middle school science and beyond. The inquiry-based FOSS curriculum is used to guide lessons as students develop an understanding of the world. At each grade level, students study earth, physical, and life sciences.

Middle 
The middle school includes grades six through eight.

English 
The middle school English curriculum builds on the character analysis work that students practiced in both primary and elementary school. Throughout the program, texts are carefully selected to include authors and protagonists of color. Each grade level has at least one unit focused on poetry and another studying the works of Shakespeare.

Math 
Harlem Academy uses the Math in Focus Singapore math program, which focuses on teaching fewer concepts with greater depth and more complex problem solving than typical programs in the United States. Middle school students develop confidence, master techniques, and employ reasoning skills to solve real-world mathematical problems.

Science 
The middle school science program is designed to build the skills students need as they progress in the sciences and make connections between scientific concepts and future career paths. Students hone the skills of scientists through scientific inquiry, analysis, and validation of experimental information and data. Each year, students focus on eight core scientific practices aligned with the Next Generation Science Standards developed by the National Academy of Science. In addition to science-specific skills, the curriculum strongly emphasizes non-fiction reading and writing. Middle school science units focus on earth science, biology, and applied science.

History 
The middle school history curriculum instills an understanding of the complex factors that shaped historical events, emphasizing use of evidence, primary and secondary sources, and analysis. Sixth graders study world history, exploring the complex factors that shape the rise and fall of civilizations. Seventh and eighth graders study U.S. history, including recent events such as 9/11.

The K-8 core curriculum is supplemented by wellness and arts activities, including fitness, mindfulness, dance, music, theater, visual arts, and Shakespeare performance workshops.

History 
Harlem Academy opened in 2004 with 12 first graders and operated out of St. Luke’s Episcopal Church. In 2005 the school moved to a storefront located at 1330 Fifth Avenue. In 2008 the school expanded to include an additional storefront located on the same city block, and in 2010 the school expanded once again to include another storefront across the street to complete the middle school. 

In 2014 the school purchased a half-acre lot at 655 St. Nicholas Avenue to build a permanent campus. The school broke ground on its 29,000 square-foot, five-story schoolhouse in August 2020, and the building’s construction was completed in December 2021.

The new campus at 655 St. Nicholas features flexible classrooms with strong technology, an expansive library, a cafe, and a dedicated play yard.

Admissions  
Harlem Academy is a selective independent school accessible to families of all economic backgrounds. Every family pays some tuition, but no student is denied admission for financial reasons. Tuition is determined on a sliding scale according to each family's ability to pay.

The admissions process begins with attendance at an informational meeting and continues with an application and an interview. The application is composed of teacher recommendations, report cards, and standardized test scores.

Partnerships and Publications 
Harlem Academy has developed innovative partnerships with universities, corporations, and nonprofit organizations to offer authentic and engaging experiences for students. Program partners include Classic Stage Company, Columbia University Neuroscience Department, Harlem School of the Arts, Poetry Society of America, Princeton Blairstown Center, and Rensselaer Polytechnic Institute.

Additionally, Harlem Academy relies on volunteers to maintain and augment its program. Volunteers have served as mentors, participated in practice interviews with students in preparation for secondary school applications, helped classes produce their own magazine, and taught art history with accompanying guided visits to the Metropolitan Museum of Art.

References

External links 
 

Educational institutions established in 2004
2004 establishments in New York City
Private elementary schools in Manhattan
Private K–8 schools in Manhattan
Private middle schools in Manhattan
Schools in Harlem